Marguerite Stitt Church (September 13, 1892 – May 26, 1990) was an American psychologist and politician who represented Illinois' 13th congressional district as a Republican from 1951 to 1963.

Early life and education
Church born in 1892 to William J. and Adelaide Stitt (née Forsythe). She grew up in the New York City metropolitan area where she attended St. Agatha School. She traveled abroad with her parents each summer, which helped develop her interest in foreign countries. In 1914, Church graduated from Wellesley College where she earned a B.A. in psychology, with a minor in economics and sociology. She went on to get a Master's degree from Columbia University in 1917.

Career
After graduating from Columbia, Church became a consulting psychologist for the State Charities Aid Association of New York City for one year. When her husband, Ralph Church, was first elected as a U.S. Representative in 1934, she became closely involved with his work. In March 1950, Ralph died of heart failure during a House committee hearing. Church ran for her husband's now vacant seat and was elected in November 1950 by the highest majority ever had by a candidate from Evanston. Church voted in favor of the Civil Rights Acts of 1957 and 1960, as well as the 24th Amendment to the U.S. Constitution.

Personal life
On December 21, 1918, she married Ralph E. Church. The couple settled in Evanston, Illinois and had three children: Ralph Jr., William, and Marjory. She died in Evanston on May 26, 1990.

Church is buried in Memorial Park, Skokie, Illinois.

See also 
 Women in the United States House of Representatives

References 

Methodists from Illinois
Columbia University alumni
Female members of the United States House of Representatives
Spouses of Illinois politicians
Wellesley College alumni
Women in Illinois politics
1892 births
1990 deaths
People from Evanston, Illinois
Politicians from New York City
Republican Party members of the United States House of Representatives from Illinois
20th-century American politicians
Burials in Illinois
20th-century American women politicians